

1977/78

Supertests & International Cup
 Football Park, Adelaide, South Australia
 Gloucester Park, Perth, Western Australia
 RAS Showground, Sydney, New South Wales
 VFL Park, Melbourne, Victoria

Country Cup
 Association Ground, Rockhampton, Queensland
 Kardinia Park, Geelong, Victoria
 Manuka Oval, Canberra, ACT
 Mildura City Oval, Victoria
 Queen Elizabeth II Oval, Bendigo, Victoria
 Wade Park, Orange, New South Wales
 Deakin Reserve, Shepparton, Victoria
 Albury Sports Ground, Albury, New South Wales
 Melville Oval, Hamilton, Victoria
 Oakes Oval, Lismore, New South Wales
 Sports Ground, Maitland, New South Wales,

Other Matches
 Moorabbin Oval, Melbourne, Victoria
 Girdlestone Park, Devonport, Tasmania

1978/79

Supertests
 Sydney Cricket Ground, New South Wales
 VFL Park, Melbourne, Victoria

International Cup
 The Gabba, Brisbane, Queensland
 Sydney Cricket Ground, New South Wales
 VFL Park, Melbourne, Victoria
 Oxley Oval, Port Macquarie, New South Wales

Cavaliers Country Tour
Venues for this year's Country Tour were usually small football ovals and sometimes cricket ovals in public parks. The venues below are listed in order of their use on the tour.
 Sir Richard Moore Sports Centre, Kalgoorlie, Western Australia
 Recreation Reserve, Bunbury, Western Australia
 Barlow Park, Cairns, Queensland
 Endeavour Park, Townsville, Queensland
 Ray Mitchell Oval, Harrup Park, Mackay, Queensland
 Association Ground, Rockhampton, Queensland
 Queensland Alumina Sports Club Oval, Gladstone, Queensland
 Salk Oval, Currumbin, Queensland
 Gold Park, Toowoomba, Queensland
 Sports Ground, Maitland, New South Wales
 Traralgon Showground, Victoria
 Football Park, Morwell, Victoria
 No. 1 Sports Ground, Newcastle, New South Wales
 Oakes Oval, Lismore, New South Wales
 Mildura City Oval, Victoria
 Queen Elizabeth II Oval, Bendigo, Victoria
 No 1 Oval, Tamworth, New South Wales
 Moran Oval, Armidale, New South Wales
 Wade Park, Orange, New South Wales
 Robertson Oval, Wagga Wagga, New South Wales
 Albury Sports Ground, Albury, New South Wales
 Melville Oval, Hamilton, Victoria
 Girdlestone Park, Devonport, Tasmania

Swan Channel 9 Cup
 Gloucester Park, Perth, Western Australia

Other Matches
 The Gabba, Brisbane, Queensland
 Sydney Cricket Ground, New South Wales
 Football Park, Adelaide, South Australia
 Manuka Oval, Canberra, ACT
 Robertson Oval, Wagga Wagga, New South Wales

New Zealand Tour
 Cooks Gardens, Wanganui, Manawatū-Whanganui
 Nelson Cricket Ground, Hastings, Hawke's Bay
 Tauranga Domain Outer Ground, Tauranga, Bay of Plenty
 Mount Smart Stadium, Auckland
 Pukekura Park, New Plymouth, Taranaki
 Te Whiti Park, Lower Hutt, Wellington

West Indies Tour

Supertests
 Antigua Recreation Ground, St. John's, Antigua and Barbuda
 Kensington Oval, Bridgetown, Barbados
 Sabina Park, Kingston, Jamaica
 Bourda, Georgetown, Guyana
 Queens Park Oval, Port of Spain, Trinidad and Tobago

One Day Matches
 Albion Sports Complex, Berbice, Guyana
 Mindoo Philip Park, St Lucia
 Sabina Park, Kingston, Jamaica
 Kensington Oval, Bridgetown, Barbados
 Queens Park Oval, Port of Spain, Trinidad and Tobago
 Warner Park, Basseterre, St Kitts
 Windsor Park, Roseau, Dominica

See also

References

World Series Cricket
World Series Cricket